Yahaya bin Ali is a Malaysian politician and currently serves as Speaker of the Terengganu State Legislative Assembly.

Election Results

Honours
  :
  Knight Commander of the Order of the Crown of Terengganu (DPMT) - Dato' (2019)

References

Malaysian Islamic Party politicians
Members of the Terengganu State Legislative Assembly
Terengganu state executive councillors
21st-century Malaysian politicians
Living people
Year of birth missing (living people)
People from Kelantan
Malaysian people of Malay descent
Malaysian Muslims